"He never married" was a phrase used by British obituary writers as a euphemism for the deceased having been homosexual. Its use has been dated to the second half of the 20th century, and it may be found in coded and non-coded forms, such as when the subject never married but was not homosexual. A similar phrase is "confirmed bachelor".

Usage
Conventional obituaries concluded with a summary of the members of the immediate family of the deceased, typically the spouse, if surviving, and children. The phrase "He never married" thus became a staple euphemism of obituary writers used to imply that the subject was homosexual. Sex between men in the United Kingdom was illegal until 1967, so few men were openly gay. The ambiguity of the phrase has been commented on, however, by a number of sources. In 1999, James Fergusson, writing in Secrets of the Press about the coded language of obituaries that he compared with the clues in a cryptic crossword, commented, He never married' closed an obituary with numbing finality" and asked "Did it, or did it not, mean that he was a hyperactive homosexual?"

In 2006, Nigel Rees dated its use to the second half of the 20th century, and noted that it was not only used without any implication of homosexuality, but that it also served the purpose of avoiding the use of the word "gay" for subjects who were open about their homosexuality but disliked that word. In 2007, Bridget Fowler noted that the phrase was used without a double meaning in her book The Obituary as Collective Memory.

However, Rose Wild of The Times observed that even where it was used in an apparently non-coded form in historic obituaries, the phrase could still be revealing of the subject; Wild gave the example of a school master's obituary from 1923 that stated "he never married", but continued that he "usually spent his holidays in a little inn frequented by seafaring men at Falmouth". In 2017, Wild wrote in The Times that the use of "He never married" began to die out in the late 1980s, "but not before it had become absurd". She noted its "otiose" use in the paper's obituaries for Robert Mapplethorpe (died 1989) and Danny La Rue (died 2009).

In 2016, Christian Barker of The Rake observed, "Until quite recently, obituary writers had a habit of concluding with the euphemism 'He never married' to subtly indicate that the subject was gay", but continued by connecting the phrase to misogamy rather than homosexuality, and asserted that there were plenty of examples of confirmed bachelors' simply shrugging off the shackles of matrimony and choosing to remain single throughout their lives—experiencing no less success because of it".

"Confirmed bachelor"
A similar phrase, "confirmed bachelor", was used in the second half of the 20th century by the satirical magazine Private Eye, as one of its many euphemisms and in-jokes. Rose Wild reported in May 2016, however, that she could only find around a dozen examples of "confirmed bachelor" in The Times obituaries, some of which were of a non-coded form, causing her to wonder whether the phrase existed much outside the imagination of the writers of Private Eye.

See also
Bachelor, an unmarried man
Invert, an outdated term referring to homosexuality 
Lavender marriage, a marriage of convenience between a man and a woman, undertaken to conceal the socially stigmatised sexual orientation of one or both partners.
LGBT erasure, a term that describes the exclusion of LGBT history from public history
Same-sex marriage, a marriage between two people of the same sex
Spinster, an unmarried woman, usually carrying pejorative connotations

References

LGBT history in the United Kingdom
English phrases
Acknowledgements of death
Men in history
Euphemisms
LGBT linguistics
Celibacy
Marriage
LGBT erasure